Banca Giuratale may refer to the following buildings in Malta:
Banca Giuratale (Valletta)
the original Banca Giuratale of Valletta, now known as the Monte di Pietà (Malta)
Banca Giuratale (Mdina)
the original Banca Giuratale of Mdina, demolished to make way for Palazzo Vilhena
Banca Giuratale (Victoria, Gozo)